Los Angeles Tribune may refer to:

 Los Angeles Tribune (1886–1890), a newspaper published by Henry H. Boyce
 Los Angeles Tribune (1911–1918), a newspaper published by Edwin T. Earl
 Los Angeles Tribune (1941–1960), a newspaper published by Almena Lomax
 Los Angeles Tribune, a fictional daily newspaper in the TV series Lou Grant